The Myanmar National League (abbreviated MNL) is the premier national professional football league of Myanmar. In 2009, the league replaced the Myanmar Premier League, which consisted only of 14 Yangon-based football clubs, with eight professional clubs representing different regions across the nation. On 16 May 2009, the league launched its inaugural two-month tournament, the Myanmar National League Cup 2009 in preparation for the first full season in 2010. Despite its national ambitions, the league held the MNL Cup 2009 matches in the country's two main stadiums in Yangon due to the lack of adequate facilities elsewhere. On 5 July 2009, Yadanabon FC defeated Yangon United FC in the MNL Cup final to become the first-ever MNL Champions.

The league added three clubs for the 2010 season  and one more club joined for the 2011 season, bringing the total to twelve clubs.
Two more clubs representing the Chin and Shan States will participate in the MNL season starting in January 2012.

Promotion and relegation will be added by the 2014 season as the MNL looks to expand once again.

History

Origins

In the past, professional football competition in Myanmar has only existed in a limited form. All premier leagues up to this point have been made up of Yangon-based football clubs, most of which were affiliated with government Ministries. It was only after 1996, when the Premier League was relaunched as the Myanmar Premier League that non-government clubs were invited to join the league. Still, the league was based only in Yangon, and never caught the imagination of Burmese football fans, who follow European football with near religious fervor.

The Myanmar Football Federation sought approval from the government to launch a nationwide league in February 2008, and finally received permission to set up private clubs in December 2008. Each club was permitted to sign at most five foreign players and one foreign coach. The government granted each club tax exemptions for an initial three-year period, while each club owner must provide a minimum initial investment of Ks.200 million (approximately US$200,000). It was expected that the annual operating cost for each club would be about Ks.500 million (US$500,000). The investment apparently covers costs such as salaries, transportation and equipment, but does not include the club stadiums, which are all nationalized.

Myanmar Derby

Myanmar Derby or The Classic Match of Myanmar is the matchup between Yangon United and Yadanarbon. It is the matchup that presents Myanmar football in the modern era. The name was given to the encounter of two teams due to the hype and massive atmosphere around the match. The first encounter between them happened in the 2009 MNL Cup season. On 18 June 2009, Yadanarbon and Yangon United met at Thuwunna Stadium, Yangon. Before the match, Yadanarbon was the leader in the table after 3 matches of the season while Yangon followed in second with one less point. Yadanarbon made the lead by 2–1 in the first forty-five minutes but Yangon bounced back to draw by the 2–2 result at the end. The match was full of the exciting and dramatic moments. Then, it was considered one of the most classic matches in Myanmar League history. The Yangon United versus Yadanarbon matchup was dubbed as "Myanmar Derby" ever since then.

Yangon Utd dominance 

The Yangon Utd Dominance refers to the 2011 to 2013 season, which Yangon United won Myanmar National League in three consecutive seasons as the first club in the league history.

The first invincibles and consecutive titles

In 2019 season, Shan United under U Aung Naing head coach Myanmar, had become the first club in the league history that completed the season with an unbeaten record. Shan United finished at the top of the final standing with 12 wins and 10 draws. They have earned a second invincible season, this time with U Han Win Aung. They have won 15 matches and drew three.

Between these two seasons, they had secured the 2020 Myanmar National League as well.

Champions

(For Burmese Champions before 2009, see Myanmar Premier League)

Wins by club

The Invincibles
Unbeaten champions:
 Shan United in 2019 and 2022

Clubs

Name Change
Delta United changed their name to Ayeyawady United to represent the Ayeyawady Division.
Okkathar United changed their name to Hantharwaddy United to represent the Bago Division.
Mahar United changed their name to Sagaing United to represent the Sagaing Division.

Personnel and sponsoring
Note: Flags indicate national team as has been defined under FIFA eligibility rules. Players may hold more than one non-FIFA nationality.

Records

All-time top scorers 

Figures for active players (in bold).

Most appearances 

Figures for active players (in bold) .

Player statistics
Youngest player: Myat Kaung Khant (Yadanarbon) — 17 years, 6 months and 0 days (15 January 2018, Yadanarbon 5–2 Ayeyawady United, 2018 Myanmar National League)
Oldest player: Phoe Chit (Sagaing United)  —  38 years,(17 August 2019, Dagon 5-2 Sagaing United, 2019 Myanmar National League)
 Youngest scorer: Myat Kaung Khant (Yadanarbon) — 17 years, 6 months and 0 days (15 January 2018, Yadanarbon 5–2 Ayeyawady United, 2018 Myanmar National League)
 Oldest scorer: Phoe Chit (Sagaing United)  —  38 years,(17 August 2019, Dagon 5-2 Sagaing United, 2019 Myanmar National League)
 Fastest scorer: Nyi Nyi Min (Dagon) - 2 minutes (17 August 2019, Dagon 5-2 Sagaing United)
 Most consecutive matches scored: Yadanarbon - 21 Matches
 Most consecutive unconceded matches: 7 matches
 Kyaw Zin Htet  (Yangon United, 2019)
 All time most clean sheets: 630 minutes — Kyaw Zin Htet 
 Most goals in a season: 28 goals — Cezar Augusto (Yangon United, 2015)
 Most assists in a season: 9 goals — Hein Htet Aung, Lwin Moe Aung (2020)
Most titles won: 6 times — David Htan  (Yangon United - 4 times, Shan United - 2 times) 
Most seasons appeared: 13 seasons — David Htan (2009-2022)
All-time record for highest football transfer fee Myanmar players: Ks.15 million— Zaw Min Tun (2014)

Awards

Prize money 
 Champion: Ks.10,00,00,000/-
 Runner-up: Ks.7,50,00,000/-
 Third Place: Ks.5,00,00,000/-

Top scorers

Coach of the Year

Player of the Year

Titles won

Managers

Winning managers

Competition format and sponsorship

Competition 
There are 12 clubs in the Myanmar League. During the course of a season, which lasts from January to October, each club plays the others twice, once at their home stadium and once at that of their opponents, for a total of 22 games. Teams receive three points for a win and one point for a draw. No points are awarded for a loss. Teams are ranked by total points, then head-to-head, then goal difference, and then goals scored. At the end of each season, the club with the most points is crowned champion. If points are equal, the head-to-head, the goal difference and then goals scored determine the winner. If still equal, teams are deemed to occupy the same position. If there is a tie for the championship, for relegation, or for qualification to other competitions, a play-off match at a neutral venue decides rank. The two lowest placed teams are relegated into the MNL-2 and the top two teams from the MNL-2 are promoted in their place.

Qualification for Asian competitions 

In the past the champions will play in AFC Champions League playoffs and AFC Cup for the champions of General Aung San Shield. Due to reforms from the AFC for the AFC Champions League and AFC Cup format, there will be no more a direct qualification spot for the AFC Champions League for that Myanmar Champion, for the time being.

Sponsorship 
The Myanmar League has been sponsored since 2009 until 2010 and has been sponsored again since 2015. The sponsor has been able to determine the league's sponsorship name. The list below details who the sponsors have been and what they called the competition:

Since 2013, 100PLUS has been the sponsor of Myanmar Football Federation and MNL. The sponsorship is extended to 2020 to support major football events in the country, the various football teams within the national setup, football tournaments for youth development and the local professional competitions.

Match balls 
 The 2009–2018 season uses the Nike.
 The 2019–2020 season uses the Molten.

Youth League 

Like the reserve league, the youth league is open to all the youth teams of all professional clubs in Myanmar.

Other tournaments
Domestic tournaments
General Aung San Shield (2010–present)
MFF Charity Cup (as MFF Opening Cup 2012–2015) (2016–present)

International tournaments
AFC Champions League (2014–present)
AFC Cup (2011-present)
Mekong Club Championship (2016–present)

Ranking Asian

AFC Club Ranking

See also
 Myanmar Premier League
 Myanmar Women League
 MNL-2

Tv broadcasters

Sky Net,Channel 9 Myanmar,MNTV Myanmar, Sky Net Sports 123456 HD Channels Myanmar ,

(online Media) 
MNL Youtube Channel,MNL-2 Youtube Channel, Genius Sports, Eleven Sports (Online Media)  Ai soccer(Online Media),Be soccer (Online Media) MyCujoo (Online Media) Sky Net DTH Youtube Channel

References

External links
 Official website
 League at fifa.com
 Soccer Myanmar Website
 RSSSF.com - Myanmar - List of Champions

 
1
Top level football leagues in Asia
Sports leagues established in 2009